Hearts Are Magnets is the first EP of singer-songwriter Jason Reeves and his first published work with producer Mikal Blue.  It was self-released in the US on February 14, 2006.

History
Hearts Are Magnets is the fourth overall release of artist Jason Reeves. After briefly attending college, Reeves kept pursuing music in his native Iowa City, Iowa and self-released three albums. Two of these albums, Makeshift Aircraft (2003) and The Nervous Mind Of Love (2004) were sold through online store cdbaby.com and at his shows. Record producer Mikal Blue discovered these albums through his manager, Anna Rambeau, whom herself found the CDs through cdbaby. Blue was interested in working with Reeves and invited him to California to record with him in his studio. Working in Blue's studio, Reeves, Blue and another producer, Curt Schneider, assembled what eventually became the EP Hearts Are Magnets.

Track listing
All songs written by Jason Reeves, except for "Pretty Eyes" which was written by Jason Reeves/Mikal Blue/Curt Schneider.

Personnel
Musicians
 Jason Reeves – vocals, acoustic guitar
 Curt Schneider – bass, vocals
 Mikal Blue – piano, guitar, vocals
 Tim Meyers – piano (1, 7)
 Andrew Williams – guitar (4, 5, 6)
 David Levita – guitar, flute (2, 3)
 Colbie Caillat – background vocals (5)
 Brian MacLeod – drums (2, 3)
 Victor Indrizzo – drums (4, 6)
 Chase Duddy – drums (5)
 David Salinas – drums (1)
 Dave Morada – bass (1)

Production
 Mikal Blue – producer
 Curt Schneider – producer
 Jason Reeves – photography
 Julie Whitten – photography
 Tyler Monks – engineer, photography
 Colbie Caillat – photography

References

2006 EPs
Jason Reeves (songwriter) EPs
Albums produced by Mikal Blue